Dalai Lama Renaissance is a 2007 feature-length documentary film, produced and directed by Khashyar Darvich, and narrated by actor Harrison Ford. The film documents the Dalai Lama's meeting with the self-titled "Synthesis" group, made up of 40 Western "renaissance" thinkers who hope to use the meeting to change the world and resolve many of the world's problems. The meeting took place at the Dalai Lama's home in Dharamsala, India in September, 1999.

The film won 12 awards, was the official selection in over 40 international film festivals, and played in cinemas in over 100 cities in the U.S., as well as other countries in the world like Germany, Austria, Switzerland.

It was also released in theaters in Taiwan in June 2009. The film received positive front page Chinese language press in Taiwan. However, The People's Daily presented an article criticizing the film.

Among the Western thinkers who meet the Dalai Lama are: quantum physicist Fred Alan Wolf, social scientist Jean Houston, and founder of Agape International Spiritual Center church in Los Angeles, Dr. Michael Beckwith.

Through the film the audience sees the clash of egos that soon developed among the members of the group and their assistants, as each member attempts to mold the meeting to fit their own personal expectations. Ultimately they discover they cannot hope to change the world until they undergo a personal transformation. Assisted by the often light-hearted musings of the Dalai Lama, each member comes away uniquely changed by their experience.

The film includes original music by Tibetan musicians.

In 2014 Wakan Films released the Poetic ReVision and Director's Cut of Dalai Lama Renaissance. Entitled Dalai Lama Awakening the film contains over 30 minutes of additional footage and a completely new score.

References

External links

Official site

2007 films
American documentary films
Documentary films about Buddhism
Films about the 14th Dalai Lama
Documentary films about spirituality
2000s American films